Raybon Brothers is the self-titled singular album of the American country music duo Raybon Brothers. The single, "Butterfly Kisses", peaked at number 37 on the Billboard Hot Country Songs chart and number 22 on the Billboard Hot 100. Another single from the album, "The Way She's Looking", reached number 67 on the Hot 100. The third and final single, "Falling" (a duet with Olivia Newton-John), failed to chart in the U.S.

"Tangled Up in Love" was written and released earlier in 1997 by Keith Urban's original band, The Ranch.

Track listing

Personnel
Adapted from liner notes.

Raybon Brothers
 Marty Raybon - vocals (all tracks)
 Tim Raybon - vocals (all tracks)

Additional Musicians
 Al Anderson - acoustic guitar (tracks 4, 5, 9, 10), electric guitar (track 9)
 Bruce C. Bouton - pedal steel guitar (tracks 1, 3-8), lap steel guitar (track 9), Dobro (tracks 2, 10)
 Dennis Burnside - piano (tracks 3, 6)
 Mark Casstevens - acoustic guitar (all tracks)
 Stuart Duncan - fiddle (tracks 3, 6)
 Larry Franklin - fiddle (tracks 2, 5, 7-10), mandolin (track 4)
 David Hungate - bass guitar (tracks 3-7, 9), acoustic bass guitar (tracks 2, 8, 10), six string bass guitar (track 5), Tic tac bass (track 8)
 John Barlow Jarvis - piano (tracks 2, 4, 5, 8, 9), keyboards (tracks 7, 10), B3 organ (track 7)
 Brent Mason - electric guitar (tracks 1, 8), gut string guitar (track 1)
 Steve Nathan - piano (track 1), keyboards (track 1)
 Olivia Newton-John - featured vocals (track 3)
 Brent Rowan - electric guitar (tracks 2-6, 9, 10), electric guitar solo (track 7)
 John Wesley Ryles - background vocals (tracks 2, 4, 8, 10)
 Mike Severs - electric guitar (tracks 2, 4, 5, 7, 8, 10)
 Lonnie Wilson - drums (all tracks), percussion (tracks 7, 10)
 Glenn Worf - bass guitar (track 1)

References

1997 debut albums
Raybon Brothers albums
MCA Records albums
Albums produced by Tony Brown (record producer)
Albums produced by Don Cook